Nebo Hill Archeological Site is a large hill a few miles southwest of Excelsior Springs, Missouri. It has one of the highest elevations in Clay County. One source states the hill is named after the family who owned the property in the 1900s, while according to another source the name is a transfer from Mount Nebo in Jordan.

Archaeological findings
The hill is now a large archaeological site, with several ancient Native American artifacts having been found there. This ancient culture has been named the Nebo Hill culture.

The ancient peoples lived along Fishing River, a tributary of the Missouri River. The culture flourished from 3,000 to 1,000 BCE. Their distinctive spearhead and axe designs, now known as the Nebo Hill axe, have been found as far north as Canada. There have also been many pottery findings. Artifacts from the Nebo Hill culture have also been found at the Renner site near Riverside, Missouri.

The Nebo Hill culture is a Late Archaic culture, and it is thought to be the ancestral to the later Kansas City Hopewellian culture.

References

External links

Archaic period in North America
Landforms of Clay County, Missouri
Native American history of Missouri
Hills of the United States
Archaeological sites on the National Register of Historic Places in Missouri
National Register of Historic Places in Kansas City, Missouri